Year 1245 (MCCXLV) was a common year starting on Sunday (link will display the full calendar) of the Julian calendar.

Events 
 By place 

 Europe 
 Winter – Siege of Jaén: Castilian forces under King Ferdinand III (the Saint) besiege the Moorish-held city of Jaén. During the siege Moorish knights sally out and manage to capture a Castilian supply caravan. Meanwhile, Ferdinand tries to launch attacks on the various city gates, but all are ineffective.
 In witness of the toll taken by war and fiscal pressure in the Kingdom of Castile, the region of Segovia is described this year as depopulated and sterile.

 England 
 King Henry III starts the work of rebuilding Westminster Abbey, as a tribute to Edward the Confessor.

 Levant 
 April – Egyptian forces under As-Salih Ayyub besiege the city of Damascus. After six months, As-Salih Ismail, ruler of Damascus, surrenders to Ayyub in return for a vassal-principality, consisting of Baalbek and the Hauran. Ayyub is awarded the title of sultan by Caliph Al-Musta'sim in Baghdad.
 
 By topic 

 Religion 
 February 21 – Thomas, bishop of Turku (modern Finland), is granted resignation by Pope Innocent IV. He admits to committing several felonies, such as torturing and forging a papal letter.
 April 16 – Innocent IV sends Giovanni da Pian del Carpine (accompanied by Stephen of Bohemia) to the Mongol court at Karakorum, suggesting that the Mongols convert to Christianity.
 June 28 – First Council of Lyon: In a general church council held at Lyon, Innocent IV declares Emperor Frederick II excommunicated and deposed. He proclaims the Seventh Crusade.

Births 
 January 16 – Edmund Crouchback, son of Henry III (d. 1296)
 May 1 – Philip III (the Bold), king of France (d. 1285)
 November 14 – Sang Sapurba, Indonesian ruler (d. 1316)
 Antony Bek (or Beck), English bishop and patriarch (d. 1311)
 Araniko (or Anige), Nepalese architect and painter (d. 1306)
 Eric of Brandenburg, archbishop of Magdeburg (d. 1295)
 Fujiwara no Saneko, Japanese empress consort (d. 1272)
 Giovanna da Signa, Italian miracle worker and saint (d. 1307) 
 Kikuchi Takefusa, Japanese nobleman and samurai (d. 1285)
 Kunigunda of Halych, queen consort of Bohemia (d. 1285)
 Ma Duanlin, Chinese encyclopaedist and politician (d. 1322)
 Nichirō, Japanese Buddhist disciple and scholar (d. 1320)
 Rinaldo da Concorezzo, Italian priest and archbishop (d. 1321)
 Roger Bigod, English nobleman and Lord Marshal (d. 1306)
 Thomas de Berkeley (the Wise), English nobleman (d. 1321)
 Yahballaha III, patriarch of the Church of the East (d. 1317)
 Ziemomysł of Kuyavia, Polish ruler of Bydgoszcz (d. 1287)

Deaths 
 January 27 – Ralph of Maidstone, bishop of Hereford
 January 28 – Giovanni Colonna, Italian cardinal (b. 1170)
 February 8 – John of la Rochelle, French theologian (b. 1200)
 February 15 – Baldwin de Redvers, English nobleman (b. 1217)
 March 22 – Roger I of Fézensaguet, French nobleman (b. 1190)
 July 22 – Kolbeinn ungi Arnórsson, Icelandic chieftain (b. 1208)
 August 19 – Ramon Berenguer IV, Spanish nobleman (b. 1198)
 August 21 – Alexander of Hales, English theologian (b. 1185)
 November 27 – Walter Marshal, English nobleman (b. 1209)
 December 4 – Christian of Oliva, bishop of Prussia (b. 1180)
 Adam of Harcarse, Scottish Cistercian priest and abbot
 Beatrice d'Este, queen consort of Hungary (b. 1215) 
 Cletus Bél, Hungarian prelate, bishop and chancellor
 Diya al-Din al-Maqdisi, Syrian scholar and writer (b. 1173)
 Fujiwara no Tadataka, Japanese regent and monk (b. 1163)
 Guillaume le Vinier, French composer and poet (b. 1190)
 Ibn al-Salah, Syrian scholar, imam and writer (b. 1181)
 Isabel de Bolebec, English noblewoman and co-heiress
 Rusudan of Georgia, queen consort of Georgia (b. 1194)

References